Winners Take All: The Elite Charade of Changing the World is a 2018 non-fiction book by American author Anand Giridharadas. It is his third book and was published by Alfred A. Knopf on August 28, 2018. The book appeared on The New York Times Best Seller list.

Thesis
In the book, Giridharadas argues that members of the global elite, though sometimes engaged in philanthropy, use their wealth and influence to preserve systems that concentrate wealth at the top at the expense of societal progress.

Publication and promotion
Winners Take All was first published in hardcover by Alfred A. Knopf on August 28, 2018. The book was also published in paperback on October 1, 2019, by Vintage Books.

The book debuted at number eight on The New York Times Hardcover Nonfiction best sellers list and at number six on its Combined Print & E-Book Nonfiction best sellers list for the September 16, 2018 issue of The New York Times Book Review. The paperback edition of the book debuted at number eight on the Paperback Nonfiction best sellers list in the October 20, 2019 issue of The New York Times Book Review.

Giridharadas appeared on The Daily Show on October 1, 2019, to promote Winners Take All. He also appeared on Patriot Act with Hasan Minhaj on December 1, 2019, speaking about the thesis of his book.

Reception
Writing for The New York Times, economist Joseph Stiglitz praised the book, writing that Giridharadas "writes on two levels—seemingly tactful and subtle—but ultimately he presents a devastating portrait of a whole class, one easier to satirize than to reform."

Publishers Weekly gave the book a positive review, writing, "This damning portrait of contemporary American philanthropy is a must-read for anyone interested in 'changing the world.

Kirkus Reviews called it a "provocative critique of the kind of modern, feel-good giving that addresses symptoms and not causes."

James Pekoll of Booklist called it an "excellent book for troubled times".

Bethany McLean of The Washington Post gave the book a mixed review, criticizing Giridharadas for not engaging "in any specific analysis" and writing that "the book would have been more powerful if Giridharadas had stayed within his definition of an old-school public intellectual: someone who is willing to throw bombs at the current state of affairs, but lacks the arrogance and self-righteousness that comes with believing you have the solution."

Andrew Anthony of The Guardian gave the book a mixed review, writing, "So much of what Giridharadas writes is almost self-evidently true and urgently in need of addressing, yet his argument is slightly undermined by repetition and a reluctance to acknowledge that big business and technical innovation are sometimes forces for universal good, even if profits are made."

It was listed in The Economists "Our books of the year", described as a "timely polemic against philanthrocapitalism, which argues that supposedly do-gooding companies merely offer sticking-plaster solutions to social problems that they have helped create."

References

2018 non-fiction books
Alfred A. Knopf books
Books about economic inequality
Books about wealth distribution
Books critical of capitalism
Philanthropy
Social philosophy literature